Kerala Hitech Industries Limited (KELTEC) was an Indian aerospace company in Thiruvananthapuram, Kerala. Its product-mix included systems required for the launch vehicles, satellite and non-rotating systems of turbojet aircraft engines. KELTEC was acquired by BrahMos Aerospace and rebranded as Brahmos Aerospace Trivandrum Ltd (BATL) in 2007.

Manufacturing facility
The Manufacturing facility is set up in a  campus in Thiruvananthapuram in the State of Kerala adjacent to the Trivandrum International Airport. The built-up area is about 10,000 sq.meters and the manpower is 300. KELTEC is a single stop work centre with multidisciplinary capability such as Conventional and CNC Machining, Metal Forming, Auto TIG and Electron Beam Welding, Vacuum Brazing, Heat Treatment, Surface Treatment etc. State-of-the-art systems for Quality Control and Metrology support the above manufacturing facilities. KELTEC can also undertake design and development of aerospace components, development of special processes like vacuum brazing of aluminium components, design and realisation of tools and fixtures required for production.

KELTEC manufactures a number of major systems for the Geosynchronous Satellite Launch Vehicle (GSLV), including Inertial Control Systems; Control System Components; High Pressure Titanium Gas Bottles; Fuel / Oxidizer Tankages & Feed Line Systems, Liquid Propulsion Engine, Convergent Divergent Nozzles; and Launch Vehicle Solid Rocket Motor Cases.

The Vikas engine is a Liquid Propellant Rocket engine which is used in the second stage of the Polar Satellite Launch Vehicle (PSLV) and the second stage and strap-on stages of the Geosynchronous Satellite Launch Vehicle (GSLV). The entire Engine which comprises more than 500 machined and welded components is manufactured at KELTEC.

Inception of KELTEC 
On 18 January 1991 the Indian Space Research Organisation (ISRO) signed an agreement with the Russian space agency Glavkosmos for the transfer of cryogenic technology. After the collapse of the Soviet Union, Russia was under considerable American influence. In this backdrop, both Glavkosmos and ISRO anticipated the United States would try and stymie the deal. So Glavkosmos and ISRO drew up a back-up plan to outsource the manufacture of the cryogenic engines to Kerala Hi-tech Industries Limited (KELTEC). The arrangement was designed to get around the provisions of the Missile Technology Control Regime (MTCR). The space czars of the two countries, Aleksey Vasin, officer-in-charge of cryogenic technology in Glavkosmos, and ISRO Chairman U.R. Rao – reckoned that if Russian cryogenic technology was passed on to ISRO via KELTEC, technically it would not be a violation of the MTCR.

References

Government-owned companies of Kerala
Indian companies established in 1991
Indian companies disestablished in 2007
1991 establishments in Kerala
Manufacturing companies established in 1991
Manufacturing companies of India